This is a list of secondary schools in Harare Province in Zimbabwe. Harare Province is made up of three municipalities: Harare, the national capital, Chitungwiza, and Epworth.

Harare

Private schools 

Arundel School
 Avenues High School
 Bishopslea Preparatory School
 Chisipite Senior School
 Cornway College
 Direct Contact School
 Dominican Convent High School
 Eaglesvale High School
 École Française de Harare
 Emerald Hill School for the Deaf
 Frestar Academy
 Futures Academy High School 
 Gateway High School
 George Emmanuel College
 Goldridge College
 Harare International School
 Hellenic Academy
 His Mercy Christian College
 The Heritage School
 Hilbright Science College
 Life Long College
 Malta Academy
 Maranatha Christian High School
 Mazowe Boys High School
 Megham International College
 Noteview College
 Phoenix College
 Pinewood High School
 Royal College
 Speciss College
 St. Christopher's School
 St. John's College
 St. John's High School
 St. George's College
 St. Peter's Kubatana High School
 Trust Academy High School
 Tynwald High School
 UUMA Elite College
 Washington Hills High School
 Westridge High School

Public schools 

 Allan Wilson Technical High School
 Budiriro 1 High School
 Budiriro 2 High School
 Churchill School
 Cranborne Boys High School
 Dzivaresekwa 1 High School
 Dzivaresekwa 2 High School
 Ellis Robins School
 George Stark High School
 Girls High School
 Glen Norah 1 High School
 Glen Norah 2 High School
 Glen View 1 High School
 Glen View 2 High School
 Glen View 3 High School
 Harare High School
 Hatcliffe High School
 Highfield 1 High School
 Highfield 2 High School
 Kambuzuma 1 High School
 Kambuzuma 2 High School
 Kuwadzana 1 High School
 Kuwadzana 2 High School
 Kwayedza High School
 Lord Malvern High School
 Mabelreign Girls High School
 Mabvuku High School
 Marlborough High School
 Mbare High School
 Morgan High School
 Mount Pleasant School
 Mufakose Mhuriimwe High School
 Mufakose 1 High School
 Mufakose 2 High School
 Mufakose 3 High School
 Mufakose 4 High School
 Mukai High School
 Oriel Boys High School
 Oriel Girls High School
 Prince Edward School
 Queen Elizabeth Girls High School
 Roosevelt Girls High School
 Tafara 1 High School
 Tafara 2 High School
 Vainona High School
 Warren Park High School
 Zimbabwe–China Friendship High School
 Zimbabwe Republic Police High School

Chitungwiza

Private schools 

 Cornerstone Senior School
 Herentals College
 Nyatsime College
 St. Mary's High School

Public schools 

 Manyame Secondary School
 Mhuri Imwe Secondary School
 Ridgeview High School
 Seke 1 High School
 Seke 2 High School
 Seke 3 High School
 Seke 4 High School
 Seke 5 High School
 Seke 6 High School
 Zengeza High School
 Zengeza 1 High School
 Zengeza 2 High School
 Zengeza 3 High School
 Zengeza 4 High School

Epworth

Public schools 

 Domboramwari High School
 Epworth High School

References 

Harare Province
Harare, secondary schools

secondary schools, Harare